The 1920 Massachusetts gubernatorial election was held on November 2, 1920.  This was the first election in which the governor was elected to a two-year term, following the adoption of amendments to the state constitution proposed by the state constitutional convention of 1917-18.

Republican primary

Governor

Candidates

Declared
Channing H. Cox, incumbent Lieutenant Governor

Declined
Calvin Coolidge, incumbent Governor (nominated for Vice President)

Lieutenant Governor Cox was unopposed for the nomination.

Results

Lieutenant Governor

Candidates

Declared
Charles L. Burrill, Treasurer and Receiver-General
Alvan T. Fuller, United States Representative from Massachusetts's 9th congressional district
Albert P. Langtry, Secretary of the Commonwealth
Joseph E. Warner, Speaker of the Massachusetts House of Representatives

Results
Congressman Alvan Fuller narrowly defeated Speaker of the State House Joseph Warner for the nomination.

Democratic primary

Governor

Candidates

Declared
Richard H. Long, nominee for Governor in 1918 and 1919
John Jackson Walsh, State Senator

Results

General election

Results

See also
 1920 Massachusetts legislature

References

Bibliography

Governor
1920
Massachusetts
November 1920 events in the United States